Ty Scott Page (May 30, 1958 - June 1, 2017) was a professional skateboarder who was known as one of the most innovative skateboarders in the world. Ty Page was a leader in the skateboarding scene during "the golden era" of skateboarding in the early 1970s. He is best known for creating a freestyle trick called the Ty Hop, which nowadays is known as the "shove-it."

Family life

Ty Page grew up in Hermosa Beach, California, a frisbee throw away from the breakwater. Ty's sister, Kim, described the family's “endless summer” life: “My dad was a huge surfer so we grew up on boards. Sometimes when the surf was good he’d say, ‘Don't go to school today. I'll write you a note and we'll go surfing.’ I really believed there was no life east of the Pacific Coast Highway.” Every summer the family lived in a camper at San Onofre Surf Club, just south of San Clemente. Life was very active and outdoors, and Ty had natural athletic ability. His mother, Donna, has said that Ty could walk two city blocks on his hands at 4 years old.

Ty began surfing at age 3 and won the national title in 1972. He was only 15 years old when he won second place at the U.S. Surfing Championships at Huntington Beach. Ty, along with fellow Makaha skateboarder Rusty Henderson, were also members of the Wave Trek Surf Team during the early 1970s.  Ty and his brother, Greg, both were active in aquatics at Redondo Union High School and both worked as lifeguards at the San Clemente beach.  When the Redondo breakwater was good, some say it was one of the best surfing locations in the South Bay. Ty and Greg were both avid surfers and displayed true talent when the breakwater was over eight feet.

Innovation

Ty was given a skateboard at the age of 4 by Greg when he received 3 boards one Christmas. Ty later said, “I’m a surfer, and I guess I like skateboarding so much because it’s very close to surfing. Surfing is harder than skateboarding, though. Every wave is different, and you have to start out fresh on each wave. With skateboarding, a hard surface is a hard surface. Once you get your balance on solid ground, you can go from there.” At first, he skated basic surf style, attempting anything that he and Bruce Logan made up. He began bank riding in 1969 and almost all of his freestyle maneuvers were original tricks. After the introduction of the urethane wheel in 1972, Ty saw real potential in the sport as a career, so he focused primarily on skateboarding.

He entered his first skateboarding competition in 1973 at the first Del Mar nationals. He says he was really nervous and couldn't eat for days before the competition. However, in 1975, he was a contest veteran and placed second in the junior men's freestyle division.  It was at this competition that the Z-Boys debuted on the skating circuit. This competition was highlighted in "Lords of Dogtown" in which Hollywood rewrote history according to Stacy Peralta’s 2001 film about Santa Monica’s “Dogtown and Z-Boys.” The movie suggested that Ty tried to change his skate style from freestyle to a more surf style, similar to the Z-Boys; however, Ty and Bruce Logan had been skating surf style with kick-turns and round-house slides as far back as 1964, before the Z-Boys began skating.

Ty took first place at the Santa Barbara Skateboard Championships with long nose wheelies, headstands, and 360s. He continued to push limits and went on to win many national competitions. He said, “One thing I’m into is I don’t like to do anything that’s easy. In all the tricks that I do, I don’t do anything that’s easy. It’s just boring; it’s not a challenge. I’m just into the challenge of things.”

"Mr. Incredible"

Ty was always attempting new stunts and going bigger and faster each time. He would make up 4 new tricks per show. He is credited with inventing over 50 new moves, including the Ty Slide, Ty Hop, Half-Hop, Pay Hop, Daffy (also called a Yeah Right Manual), Head Spinner (also called 360 Headstand), Foot Spin, Foot-Spin 360, Toe Spin, Toe-Spin 360, and almost every backwards footwork maneuver.

Unity Surfskate in Hermosa Beach made the first skateboard push by sponsoring Ty Page and putting out a popular, wooden kick-tail skateboard called the Ty Stix. The second generation Makaha team of Ty Page, Bruce Logan, Rusty Henderson, Mike Purpus, and Torger Johnson was put together to promote the invention that changed skateboarding forever – the kicktail and double kicktail boards. Some say the Makaha team was the best skateboarding team ever assembled. Mike Purpus said, "The reason the Z-Boys got more recognition was because they were loud and obnoxious, while the Makaha Team just skated great and went on quietly winning contests." Ty later signed with California Free Former, the world's largest skateboard manufacturer.

"Mr. Incredible," as he was known, placed first in dozens of major skateboarding competitions and has been the holder of numerous surfing and skateboarding titles. He was known not only as a freestyler, but also as a capable skateracer, bowl rider, pool rider, and as a giant and straight slalom skater.

Ty's multi-faceted, rapid-fire technique and footwork were nothing short of incredible. After trying many times to photograph his footwork, SkateBoarder magazine was forced to purchase a new $3,000 high-speed camera to catch him on film to publish in the August and September 1977 issues. He appeared on the cover of many national and international magazines and was frequently featured in skateboarding magazines and journals as well as Newsweek and Sports Illustrated.

In addition, his line of skateboards was revolutionary in performance. The Ty Page Professional Skateboards were designed by Ty himself to be different from all other boards. The boards and Ty Page Black Gold wheels were heavily promoted by Blammo Gum and California Free Formers in every major newspaper in the country.

The Big Time

At the age of 17, Ty signed with Bill Riordan, an international sports promoter. In just a few years, Ty was earning over $100,000 a year on the skateboarding circuit.  In the 1970s, skateboarding was the fastest growing sport in the country as evidenced by the 40 million skateboards sold and the multimillion-dollar support industry of protective gear and equipment that emerged.  Of the 200 professional skateboarders, only a few had that kind of success; he was a true superstar. In addition to prize money from competitions, Ty had major endorsement deals. Ty was paid $1 for every Ty Page Professional Skateboard that was sold, and he was paid for appearances, commercials, movie appearances, and to test new model boards. By the time he was 19 years old, he had an oceanfront apartment and a new Alfa Romeo Spider.

In 1976, Ty performed in New York, and his exhibition attracted the kind of media coverage usually reserved for Muhammad Ali. Ty starred in several commercials, including Sunny Delight, Wendy's, and MG cars, and appeared in several movies. Ty was a U.S. Goodwill Ambassador and traveled around the world performing in exhibitions and safety demonstrations. In 1977, he was awarded the key to the city of New Orleans by the mayor. He was huge in Japan and went there two or three times, and he was also famous in Europe, especially Germany, Spain, France, and Italy. After two spectacular tours through Germany, Ty was featured as the centerfold in the November/December 1977 German issue of Skateboard, the first U.S. skater to be so honored.

In March 1978, the California Free Former team was featured in Cal Jam 2, skating to Aerosmith, Heart, Ted Nugent and others. Ty skated to the Latin rhythms of “Black Magic Woman” as Carlos Santana performed on stage. The show set a new record for the largest audience in the history of skateboarding – an estimated 300,000 – and was aired nationally on ABC. Ty's half-pipe skating was highlighted on the cover of Wild World of Skateboarding Magazine in July 1978.

The Legend

Ty Page was a leader in the 1970s skateboard world. He was a true professional with a genuine interest in promoting the sport in a positive manner. He performed at safety demonstrations and consistently recommended the use of safety equipment and emphasized not riding in the streets regardless of traffic. He brought integrity to the sport and upheld an image that was good for skateboarding.  In 1998, he was inducted into the Thrasher Skateboard Hall of Fame. On May 13, 2016, Ty Page was inducted into the IASC Skateboarding Hall of Fame.

In 2015 Ty Page announced that he had brain cancer, an astrocytoma of a frontal lobe. He underwent chemotherapy and radiation, as well as alternative therapies. He died June 1, 2017. He lived with his wife and three sons in Park City, Utah. He skateboarded and snowboarded once in a while, and surfed in Hawaii.

References

External links
 Official Site 
 Ty Page on MySpace

American skateboarders
American surfers
1958 births
2017 deaths
Sportspeople from Los Angeles County, California
People from Hermosa Beach, California